Juneau Mountain Rescue (JMR) is a mountain search and rescue agency, located in Juneau, Alaska, United States. JMR is a member of the Alaska Search and Rescue Association, and facilitates rescues involving wilderness terrain, rope rescues on rock faces, ice and snow fields, glaciers, and during avalanches, medical evacuations, missing persons cases, aircraft crashes and other disasters. An all-volunteer organization, JMR coordinates with Capital City Fire/Rescue, the Juneau Police Department, the Alaska State Troopers, the United States Coast Guard, and other emergency response agencies during search and rescue operations.

Operational history
Juneau Mountain Rescue was founded in 1982 after Steve Lewis taught a series of high-angle rescue classes in the Spring, Summer and Fall of 1982. Founding members: Steve Lewis, Bob Poe and Cathy Poe, and Jeff Badger.  In 1989, Lewis, Cynda Stanek, and William (Bill) Wildes incorporated JMR. Lewis served as JMR's director until 2009 – having completed more than 212 search, rescue and recovery operations.  Since 2004, JMR has been a fully accredited member of the international Mountain Rescue Association (MRA), having passed a rigorous test of JMR's rescue abilities at Juneau's Eaglecrest Ski Area. At the time of its accreditation, JMR was one of 56 mountain rescue agencies accredited by the MRA.

Juneau Mountain Rescue operates under the FCC call sign WPZP295 for radio communications. The call sign is currently licensed until February 11, 2024.

Notable incidents
In December 2000, a Bellanca Scout airplane carrying former Routt County, Colorado Sheriff Ed Burch, at the time working as a flight instructor, and another man went missing during a training flight near Juneau. Juneau Mountain Rescue, working with other agencies, including the local Civil Air Patrol and the Army National Guard, found pieces of the Scout between Douglas and Admiralty Island. The plane's fuselage and passengers were never found.

In January 2011, JMR volunteers, working with the Alaska State Troopers and the Coast Guard, rescued an injured hiker on Ripikski Mountain, near Haines. A Coast Guard crew on a MH-60 Jayhawk helicopter, dispatched from Sitka, transported the hiker to Bartlett Regional Hospital in Juneau.

In March 2014, two teenage boys, one a local resident and the other a visitor from Switzerland, got lost hiking on Mount Juneau. The teens were able to call for help on a cell phone, and told emergency dispatchers that they were "cold and disoriented". JMR volunteers, working with a commercial helicopter company, located the teenagers and returned them to town.

In May 2014, a woman named Sharon Buis was reported missing in the area of Juneau's Mount Roberts. A search was coordinated by JMR on both Mount Juneau and Mount Roberts, with parts of the effort being facilitated by use of the Mount Roberts Tramway. JMR coordinated with the Alaska State Troopers, and the US Coast Guard during the lengthy search. Despite an exhaustive search, Buis was never found. After several days of searching, the case was transferred to the Juneau Police Department, and is an active missing persons case.

On February 15, 2015, four hikers were rescued by members of JMR, after becoming stranded in mountainous wilderness in the Thane area of Juneau. The hikers suffered injuries related to cold weather conditions, and were taken to Bartlett Regional Hospital.

References

External links
 Official website

1982 establishments in Alaska
Juneau, Alaska
Mountain rescue agencies
Non-profit organizations based in Juneau, Alaska
Volunteer search and rescue organizations